Arkys walckenaeri, the triangular spider or Walckenaer's studded arkys, is a common Australian spider belonging to the family Arkyidae. A small ambush hunter with long curved forelegs and a narrow, triangular shaped abdomen. Named in honour of Charles Athanase Walckenaer.

References

Arkyidae
Spiders of Australia
Spiders described in 1879